155–171 Oakhill Road is a Grade II listed block of flats designed in an Arts and Crafts style as a row of four cottages and a laundry block at the rear in Oakhill Road, Putney, London SW15.

It was built in 1906, and the architect was William Hunt, together with his son and partner Edward Hunt.

References

External links
 

Houses in the London Borough of Wandsworth
Grade II listed buildings in the London Borough of Wandsworth
Arts and Crafts movement